.
Copera tokyoensis is a species of white-legged damselfly in the family Platycnemididae. It can be found in Japan, China, and Korea.

References

Further reading

 

Platycnemididae
Articles created by Qbugbot
Insects described in 1948
Odonata of Asia
Insects of China
Insects of Japan
Insects of Korea